Blackfeet National Forest was established by the U.S. Forest Service in Montana on July 1, 1908 with .  On June 22, 1935 Blackfeet was divided between Flathead National Forest and Kootenai National Forest, and the name was discontinued.

See also
 List of forests in Montana

References

External links
Forest History Society
Forest History Society:Listing of the National Forests of the United States Text from Davis, Richard C., ed. Encyclopedia of American Forest and Conservation History. New York: Macmillan Publishing Company for the Forest History Society, 1983. Vol. II, pp. 743-788.

Former National Forests of Montana
1908 establishments in Montana